Little Computer People, also called House-on-a-Disk, is a social simulation game released in 1985 by Activision for the 
Commodore 64, ZX Spectrum, Amstrad CPC, Atari ST and Apple II. An Amiga version was released in 1987. Two Japanese versions were also released in 1987, a Family Computer Disk System version, published in Japan by DOG (a subsidiary of Square), and a PC-8801 version.

Gameplay
The game has no winning conditions, and one setting: a sideways view of the inside of a three-story house. After a short time, an animated character will move in and occupy the house. He goes about a daily routine, doing everyday things like cooking, watching television or reading the newspaper. Players are able to interact with this person in various ways, including entering simple commands for the character to perform, playing a game of poker with him and offering presents. On occasion, the character initiates contact on his own, inviting the player to a game or writing a letter explaining his feelings and needs. Each copy of the game generates its own unique character, so no two copies play exactly the same. The character's name is randomly selected from a list of 256 names.

The documentation that accompanied the game fully kept up the pretense of the "little people" being real, and living inside one's computer (the software merely "bringing them out"), with the player as their caretaker.

Two versions of the game existed for the Commodore 64: the disk version, which played as described above, and the cassette version, which omitted several features.  On tape versions, the Little Computer Person was generated from scratch every time the game was started up (not only on the first boot, as with other versions), and thus did not go through the "moving in" sequence seen on other versions. Also, on cassette versions the Computer Person had no memory, and did not communicate meaningfully with the user; and the card games, such as poker, could not be played.

Copy protection
In pirated copies of the game on the Atari ST (and possibly other platforms) the game would load, but the character would simply stand knocking on the screen and wagging a finger at the player disapprovingly.

Add-ons
According to "High Score!", add-ons were planned, such as diskettes filled with new furniture and an "LCP Apartment" in an apartment building, with the LCPs all interacting. These add-ons, also described in terms of a sequel expanding on the LCP concept, never materialized.

Reception 
Roy Wagner reviewed the game for Computer Gaming World, and stated that "The game is more cute than fun or challenging. The range of activities are limited and not very exciting, but can be interesting. The "game" is ideally suited for children. It does a good job of teaching about caring for another."

Little Computer People earned a Zzap!64 Gold Medal Award in 1985. Games magazine listed it as one of its top 10 best entertainment software produced in 1985. Jerry Pournelle of BYTE named it his game of the month for December 1986, stating "That's not strictly a game, but it sure has consumed all the game time we have around here" and that the Amiga version's graphics were preferable to the Atari ST's.

Compute! favorably reviewed the Atari ST version in 1987, stating that it had "enormous and subtle educational appeal" to children and others. The magazine concluded that Little Computer People "is a delightful program". The game was voted best original game of the year at the 1986 Golden Joystick Awards.

Reviews
Isaac Asimov's Science Fiction Magazine v11 n1 (1987 01)

Japanese versions

Apple Town Story

 is a port of Little Computer People to the Family Computer Disk System. The port was released by Square of Final Fantasy fame in 1987. Unlike previous versions of Little Computer People, the playable character is a girl wearing a pink dress and bow in her hair. The rooms of the house are also in a different configuration, featuring an outdoor balcony on the top floor. When the game is first played, a name for the character is chosen at random from a preprogrammed list. Apple Town Story lacks many of the features found in other versions of Little Computer People. The game's soundtrack was written by Nobuo Uematsu, who would later become recognized for his work in the Final Fantasy series.

PC-8801 version
In December 1987, a second Japanese version of the game was released for the PC-8801 computer, titled Little Computer People (リトルコンピュータピープル). Like Apple Town Story, this game also features a female character, only older and more glamorous in appearance. Aside from the character, this version of the game is far more like the original in all other respects.

Legacy
Will Wright, designer of The Sims, has mentioned playing Little Computer People and receiving valuable feedback on The Sims from its designer, Rich Gold.

In 1998 German electro musician Anthony Rother released a single, Little Computer People, which is inspired by the computer game.

References

External links

Little Computer People Information Preservation Article filed under Pac-Man's Notes at Pac-Attack.com
Little Computer People Research Project (extensive information on C64 version) at The-Commodore-Zone
Legends of the C64 article on David Crane (includes Little Computer People info)
Technical information on how the random characters were generated at Software Preservation Society

1985 video games
1987 video games
Activision games
Amiga games
Amstrad CPC games
Apple II games
Atari ST games
Commodore 64 games
Famicom Disk System games
God games
Golden Joystick Award winners
NEC PC-8801 games
NEC PC-9801 games
Social simulation video games
Square (video game company) games
Video games scored by Nobuo Uematsu
ZX Spectrum games
Video games developed in the United States